Scutiger ghunsa is a species of toad in the family Megophryidae. It is endemic to eastern Nepal and only known from its eponymous type locality, Ghunsa, in the Taplejung District. This species is also known as Ghunsa alpine toad and Ghunsa high altitude toad. Its closest relatives are Scutiger nepalensis and Scutiger sikimmensis.

Description
Males measure  and females  in snout–vent length. The head is wider than it is long. The snout is short and rounded. The paratoid glands are large. The canthus rostralis is distinct. No tympanum is visible. The forelimbs are short and robust, while the hindlimbs are long and powerful. The finger and toe tips are rounded. The fingers have no webbing while the toes are weakly webbed. males have nuptial spines on the dorsal surface of the first three fingers. Dorsal skin in males is rough with scattered warts bearing black spines. The flanks bear larger, white warts or granules. Females have smooth skin. The upper parts are light brown. There is an olive brown triangular spot on the snout and interorbital region. The flanks are light brown, ventrally fading into creamy yellow. The ventral surfaces are creamy white with irregular, light gray-brown lines.

A male found guarding eggs under a rock suggests a degree of parental care, a behavior previously unknown for this genus. Tadpoles of Gosner stage 27 measure  in total length, of which the tail makes two thirds. The body is oval. The upper tail fin is higher than the lower one; both converge at the pointed tail tip.

Habitat
The locality is characterized by a mixed rhododendron forest with low canopy cover and a slow-running stream with stagnant pools.

Conservation
As of late 2020, this species had not yet been assessed for the IUCN Red List of Threatened Species, but the original describers suggested that it should be considered "data deficient". The known population is within the Kanchenjunga Conservation Area. The species was named after its type locality in hope that this would raise awareness and further help to conserve the flora and fauna in the area.

References

ghunsa
Amphibians of Nepal
Endemic fauna of Nepal
Amphibians described in 2019
Taxa named by David C. Cannatella